The Loop is a  beltway around Texarkana, TX and Texarkana, AR, which are twin cities in the U.S. states of Arkansas and Texas. Consisting of a section of Interstate 49 (I-49) in Arkansas, and Loop 151 and a section of I-369 and U.S. Route 59 (US 59) in Texas, it forms a three-quarter loop around the east, south and west sides of the city. (I-30 completes the circle on the north side.) The Loop is built to Interstate Highway standards.

The south side is bisected by State Line Avenue, which travels north–south along the state line. The entire half in Arkansas is I-49 and Arkansas Highway 151 (AR 151), which is unsigned. US 59 has an interchange with the Loop near the southwest corner, only the south side in Texas is Loop 151. Old US 59 into Texarkana (Lake Drive) is now Texas State Highway 93 (SH 93).

Route description

The Loop consists of I-30, I-369, Loop 151, and AR 151. US 59 is concurrent with the beltway from the southwest corner of Texarkana to State Line Avenue. I-30 forms the northern portion of the route, running north of both the twin cities. The eastern section of the Loop consists of I-49 and AR 151, and runs from US 59/71 north of I-30 to an interchange with I-49 on the southeast side of Texarkana. The southern section of the loop consists of Loop 151 and AR 151. It runs from I-49 in southeast Texarkana to I-369 in southwest Texarkana. The western section of the loop is formed by I-369. I-369 continues north on the western side of Texarkana to a stack interchange with I-30 in northwest Texarkana.

History
Previously in Texas, the "151" designation was originally used for Spur 151, which was designated on May 18, 1944, from Denison to the southern boundary of the Federal Government Property. Spur 151 was cancelled on May 21, 1946, and instead replaced by SH 75A, which in turn became SH 91 on December 21, 1994. Loop 151 was designated on August 27, 1958, from I-30 to US 82. On January 20, 1966, Loop 151 extended south to US 59. On December 21, 1982, Loop 151 was transferred to US 59, so Loop 151 was reassigned to the old route of US 59. On February 7, 1985, Loop 151 was transferred to SH 93, so Loop 151 was reused for the route from US 59 to Arkansas, its current route.

In fall 2000, the Arkansas State Highway and Transportation Department  had submitted its portion of the loop as Interstate 130 (I-130) in fall 2000. However, the American Association of State Highway and Transportation Officials denied the part from US 71 west to Texas, as "the state of Texas has not submitted a companion application for a suitable terminus in Texas", but the piece from US 71 north to I-30 was approved on December 8, 2000, as Future I-130. Once it was upgraded to interstate standards and added to the Interstate Highway System by the Federal Highway Administration, it was to be signed as I-130. Arkansas used the American Recovery and Reinvestment Act of 2009 (ARRA) funds to pave the final segment of future I-130, from the Arkansas Boulevard interchange to a new freeway-to-freeway interchange with I-30. Once this section was opened, the only remaining requirement to become I-130 would have been to upgrade the at-grade intersection with 19th Street to a full interchange; the right-of-way for this was reserved years ago. However, with I-49 also pending completion between Texarkana and Shreveport, Louisiana (including a segment in Arkansas also being built with ARRA funds), future I-130 was instead made part of I-49 by summer 2014.

In May 2013, the final designated portion of AR 245 was removed from service and re-designated Four States Fair Blvd. Highway 245 was the former designation of Arkansas's section of the loop.

Interstate 369 was designated on May 30, and signs of the highway were installed on September 23, 2013.

Exit list

References

Texarkana
Roads in Arkansas
Roads in Texas
Loop
Texarkana, Arkansas
Texarkana, Texas
Freeways in the United States
Freeways in Texas
Transportation in Miller County, Arkansas
Transportation in Bowie County, Texas
Interstate 30
Texarkana
U.S. Route 59